Isabelle Arène (born 5 May 1958) is a French diver. She competed in the women's 3 metre springboard event at the 1980 Summer Olympics.

References

1958 births
Living people
French female divers
Olympic divers of France
Divers at the 1980 Summer Olympics
Place of birth missing (living people)
20th-century French women